Elliota is a ghost town in Canton Township, Fillmore County, in the U.S. state of Minnesota.

History
Elliota was founded in 1853 by Captain Julius W. Elliott, the first settler, postmaster, and blacksmith. A post office was established at Elliota in 1854, and remained in operation until it was discontinued in 1882. The Elliota cemetery remains today.

References

Former populated places in Fillmore County, Minnesota
Ghost towns in Minnesota